Bart Preneel (born 15 October 1963 in Leuven, Belgium) is a Flemish cryptographer and cryptanalyst. He is a professor at Katholieke Universiteit Leuven, in the COSIC group. 

He was the president of the International Association for Cryptologic Research  in 2008-2013 and project manager of ECRYPT.

Education 
In 1987, Preneel received an electrical engineering degree in applied science from the Katholieke Universiteit, Leuven.

In 1993, Preneel received a PhD from the Katholieke Universiteit Leuven. His dissertation in computer science, entitled Analysis and Design of Cryptographic Hash Functions, was advised by Joos (Joseph) P. L. Vandewalle and René J. M. Govaerts.

Career 
Along with Shoji Miyaguchi, he independently invented the Miyaguchi–Preneel scheme, a complex structure used in the hash function Whirlpool. He is one of the authors of the RIPEMD-160 hash function. He was also a co-inventor of the stream cipher MUGI which would later become a Japanese standard, and of the stream cipher Trivium which was a well-received entrant to the eSTREAM project.

He has also contributed to the cryptanalysis of RC4, SOBER-t32, MacGuffin, Helix, Phelix, Py, TPypy, the HAVAL cryptographic hash function, and the SecurID hash function.

References

External links
 Home page

Living people
1963 births
Belgian cryptographers
Flemish scientists
Academic staff of KU Leuven
Modern cryptographers